Jordan Leslie Eberle (born May 15, 1990) is a Canadian professional ice hockey right winger and alternate captain for the Seattle Kraken of the National Hockey League (NHL). He was selected in the first round (22nd overall) in the 2008 NHL Entry Draft by the Edmonton Oilers.

During his four-year junior career with the Regina Pats of the Western Hockey League (WHL), he won the CHL Player of the Year Award in 2010, the Doc Seaman Trophy as the scholastic player of the year in 2008 and was a two-time First Team East All-Star in 2008 and 2010. In his second season in the NHL, Eberle was named to the All-Star Game and led the Oilers in goal- and point-scoring.

Internationally, Eberle has competed for Canada in two World Junior Championships, winning gold and silver in 2009 and 2010, respectively. He was named Tournament MVP and Best Forward at the 2010 World Junior Championships and is tied with Brayden Schenn as Canada's third all-time leading scorer at the tournament with 26 points. Both are 5 behind Eric Lindros' 31 points and 8 behind Connor Bedard's 34 points. TSN named him the best Canadian World Junior Player ever, being the only player to have earned points in all 12 career games played, the longest career scoring streak in team history by five games.

Playing career

Early career
Eberle played novice with Hockey Regina's tier-1 Kings and amassed 216 goals over sixty games in 1999–2000. He went on to play Bantam AAA for the Athol Murray College of Notre Dame in Wilcox, Saskatchewan, as a fourteen-year-old. After being selected by his hometown major junior team, the Regina Pats of the Western Hockey League (WHL), in the seventh round (126th overall) of the 2005 WHL Bantam Draft, Eberle joined the midget ranks with the Calgary Buffaloes of the Alberta Midget Hockey League (AMHL). He won a bronze medal with the Buffaloes at the 2006 Mac's Midget Hockey Tournament, scoring two goals in the bronze-medal game against the Prince Albert Mintos. He helped his team qualify for the 2006 Telus Cup national midget championship, where the Buffaloes lost a 5–4 triple-overtime game in the final against the Mintos. Eberle scored a goal in the losing effort and was awarded the Most Sportsmanlike Award for the tournament.

Major junior
Eberle debuted with the Pats in 2006–07, scoring 55 points and a team-high 28 goals as a rookie. He added two goals and seven points in six games against the Swift Current Broncos in the opening round of the 2007 WHL playoffs, but was sidelined for the entirety of the second round against the Medicine Hat Tigers with a virus. Eberle started his second major junior season by earning WHL Player of the Month honours for October 2007, totalling sixteen goals and 26 points over sixteen games for the Pats. He had missed two games early in the season with tonsillitis, before scoring a hat trick in his return on October 6, 2007, against the Moose Jaw Warriors. Eberle later represented Team WHL against Russia in the 2007 ADT Canada-Russia Challenge in late November. Midway through the season, he was chosen to compete in the 2008 CHL Top Prospects Game in Edmonton.

Eberle finished 2007–08 with a team-high 42 goals and 75 points. His 42 goals accounted for one-fifth of his team's scoring and marked the first time a Pats player hit the forty-goal mark since Matt Hubbauer scored 48 in 2001–02. It also tied for fourth in league scoring with Drayson Bowman of the Spokane Chiefs. He was selected to the WHL East First All-Star Team and received the Doc Seaman Trophy as WHL Scholastic Player of the Year (beating out defenceman Jared Cowen of the Spokane Chiefs).

Eberle had started the 2007–08 season ranked seventh among WHL skaters in the NHL Central Scouting Bureau's preliminary rankings for the 2008 NHL Entry Draft. At mid-season, he was ranked 24th among North American skaters, then dropped to 33rd in the NHL CSS's final rankings. Director of NHL Central Scouting E. J. McGuire described Eberle as a scorer whose strengths are his skating and stickhandling. He was selected in the first round, 22nd overall, by the Edmonton Oilers. Having grown up in Regina, Eberle was a childhood fan of the Oilers, even after his family moved to Calgary at fourteen years old. After being selected, he commented in an interview, "If I had to pick one pick, [the Oilers] would have been it."

Eberle competed in his second ADT Canada–Russia Challenge for Team WHL in 2008. After completing the 2008–09 WHL season with a team-leading 74 points in 61 games, Eberle was signed to a three-year, entry-level contract with the Oilers on March 23, 2009.

Competing for a roster spot with the Oilers in the 2009 training camp, Eberle was one of the final cuts. He was returned to the Pats on September 27, 2009, and reeled off 25 points in twelve games to be named WHL Player of the Month for September and October. He was named to Team WHL for the 2009 Subway Super Series (formerly known as the ADT Canada–Russia Challenge) and was selected as an alternate captain to Pats teammate Colten Teubert for Game 5. Eberle finished the 2009–10 WHL season second in league scoring with 106 points in 57 games (one point behind Brandon Kozun of the Calgary Hitmen in eight fewer games) and was a unanimous selection to his second WHL East First All-Star Team in three years. He was the first member of the Pats to score 50 goals and record 100 points since Ronald Petrovický during the 1997–98 season. Eberle finished his career with the Pats seventh all-time in franchise goal scoring with 155 and twelfth in points with 310. Eberle was named the Regina Pats Player of the Year, Most Sportsmanlike Player and the Most Popular player after the 2009–10 season. Despite the Pats' disappointing season as a team, Eberle was selected as the winner of the Four Broncos Memorial Trophy as WHL Player of the Year, defeating Western Conference nominee Craig Cunningham of the Vancouver Giants. He was later named CHL Player of the Year, beating out the Ontario Hockey League (OHL) and Quebec Major Junior Hockey League (QMJHL) nominees Tyler Seguin and Mike Hoffman, respectively. It marked the third time that a Pats player won the award, after Ed Staniowski in 1975 and Doug Wickenheiser in 1980.

In recognition of his outstanding junior hockey career, the Pats retired Eberle's number 7 on December 5, 2012.

Professional

Edmonton Oilers
Soon after signing a professional contract with the Oilers in 2009, Eberle was assigned to the teams' minor league affiliate, the Springfield Falcons of the American Hockey League (AHL), for the remainder of the 2008–09 season. He scored his first professional goal in his third game with the Falcons, a 4–3 loss to the Portland Pirates, on March 29, 2009. He went on to tally three goals and nine points in nine games. Eberle was again assigned to the Falcons after finishing the 2009–10 season with the Pats. He notched six goals and 14 points in the Falcons' last 11 games of the regular season.

Eberle made his NHL debut with the Oilers on October 7, 2010, against the Calgary Flames. He recorded his first goal, on the penalty kill in the third period, deking past defenceman Ian White on a two-on-one before scoring on a backhand deke past goaltender Miikka Kiprusoff. The goal was later voted by fans as the NHL's Goal of the Year on the League's Facebook page, as well as Play of the Year on The Sports Network's website. He later added an assist on the powerplay, taking a shot that deflected off teammate Shawn Horcoff's shinpads. The Oilers went on to win the game 4–0. Eberle was named the first star of the game. Later in the season, Eberle suffered a high ankle sprain after colliding with opposing forward Aleš Kotalík during a game against the Flames on January 1, 2011. While sidelined with the injury, he underwent an unrelated emergency appendectomy four days later. Missing 13 games with his ankle injury, he returned to action in early February. During a game against the Vancouver Canucks late in the season, on April 5, Eberle received a hit to the head from opposing forward Raffi Torres. While Eberle was not injured on the play, Torres received a four-game suspension for the hit. Eberle finished the season with 43 points (18 goals and 25 assists) in 69 games, leading his team in scoring and ranking sixth among league rookies. Though the Oilers finished with the worst record in the NHL for the second straight year, expectations remained high in Edmonton for the future of the team, as Eberle's success as a rookie was matched by the performance of fellow first-year forwards Taylor Hall and Magnus Pääjärvi.

During his second NHL season, Eberle sustained a sprained knee after colliding with Dallas Stars forward Jamie Benn during a game on January 7, 2012. At the time of the injury, Eberle was among the league's top scorers and six points behind the league's leader. Despite his success, he was left off the 2012 NHL All-Star Game roster, which was selected while he was sidelined. Several members within the Oilers organization were outspoken regarding the omission, including captain Shawn Horcoff and Head Coach Tom Renney, to which the League replied that Eberle would have been selected had he not been injured. By January 19, Eberle returned to the Oilers line-up after missing four games. Five days later, he was nonetheless named as an All-Star replacement for the injured Mikko Koivu. Eberle was selected to Team Chara as part of the All-Star Fantasy Draft and went on to record an assist in the squad's 12–9 win against Team Alfredsson. The following month, Eberle recorded his 100th career NHL point on February 21, 2012, with a goal and two assists in a 6–1 victory over the Calgary Flames. He finished his second NHL season leading with a team-leading 34 goals, 42 assists and 76 points. Among league scorers, he ranked 16th in goals and points. The Oilers continued to struggle as a team, however, and finished 14th in the Western Conference with 32 wins and 74 points.

On April 23, 2012, Eberle was nominated for the Lady Byng Memorial Trophy, along with the Florida Panthers' Brian Campbell and the New York Islanders' Matt Moulson.

On August 30, 2012, Eberle signed a six-year, $36 million contract extension with the Oilers.

During the 2012–13 NHL lockout, Eberle played for the Oklahoma City Barons of the AHL and at the time the lock-out was resolved, Eberle was leading the league with 25 goals and 51 points. This led Eberle to become AHL Player of the Month for two consecutive months.

On February 11, 2016, in a game against the Toronto Maple Leafs, Eberle scored his first career NHL hat-trick. All three goals were assisted by Connor McDavid. This also happened to be the final hat-trick scored at Rexall Place.

In the 2016–17 season, the Oilers qualified for the Stanley Cup Playoffs for the first time since their 2006 Stanley Cup Finals run 10 years prior, well before Eberle was drafted. While the Oilers advanced to the second round after a seven-game series against the San Jose Sharks, they were eliminated in six games against the Anaheim Ducks, and Eberle performed poorly throughout the tournament. He scored only two assists in 13 playoff games, the only time he would advance to the playoffs with Edmonton.

New York Islanders
Following the Oilers' elimination from the 2017 playoffs, Eberle was traded to the New York Islanders in exchange for Ryan Strome on June 22, 2017. Eberle left the Oilers organization with a total of 165 goals and 217 assists through 507 games. Following the trade, Eberle revealed that he had struggled mentally with the Oilers' lack of success and was appreciative for the trade. Upon joining the Islanders, Eberle was expected to start the 2017–18 NHL season as the top-line right wing alongside John Tavares and Anders Lee. While on this line, Eberle led the team in assists with six through their first nine games to help the team maintain a 5–3–1 record. However, after going goalless in his first 10 games, coach Doug Weight moved Eberle onto a line with rookie center Mathew Barzal. By the time Eberle faced the Oilers on 7 November, he had accumulated four goals and seven assists in 14 games, including two multipoint games. He continued to score while playing on the Islanders' second line and quickly maintained a six-game goal streak. By the quarter-way mark into the season, Eberle had become a mainstay on Barzal's line as the Islanders maintained a 12–7–2 record with 26 points. Following a win over the Washington Capitals on December 11, Eberle became the eighth Islander to reach double-digits in assists during the 2017–18 season. Later in the month, Eberle assisted on all three of Barzal's goals as he became the first Islander rookie since Michael Grabner to record a hat trick. Eberle, Barzal, and Andrew Ladd were steady linemates through the first half of the season before Ladd suffered an injury in early January. Once Anthony Beauvillier returned to the NHL lineup in January after a stint in the AHL, he joined Barzal and Eberle on the Islanders second line. While playing with Beauvillier and Barzal on 13 January, Eberle recorded a career-high four assists in one game as the Islanders toppled the New York Rangers. Over the course of three games with Beauvillier and Barzal, Eberle recorded three assists while Barzal tallied 10 points and Beauvillier accumulated five points. Eberle later reached the 20-goal mark for the 6th time in his career during a 3–0 shutout of the Rangers on 15 February. Eberle missed his first game with the Islanders on 2 March due to lingering soreness from a previous game. As such, he lost his ironman streak to Nick Leddy with 142 straight games. Eberle returned to the lineup the following game but the Islanders continued their six-game losing streak. By 7 March, Eberle had tallied 23 goals and 24 assists for 47 points through 66 games. Eberle finished his first season with the Islanders with 25 goals and 34 assists for 59 points as the team failed to qualify for the 2018 Stanley Cup playoffs.

During the 2018 offseason, the Islanders underwent numerous important changes. Head coach Doug Weight was replaced with Barry Trotz and captain John Tavares left the team as an unrestricted free agent. Eberle entered the 2018–19 season in the final year of his contract but was adamant he was focusing on hockey instead of contract discussions. Due to Tavares' departure, Eberle, Barzal, and Lee were expected to become the Islanders' new top line. However, Trotz re-designed the top-six so that Eberl was partnered with Lee and Brock Nelson on the second line while Barzal joined Josh Bailey and Beauvillier on the top line. Eberle struggled to build chemistry with his new linemates and failed to produce at the same level as the previous season. He experienced an 18-game goalless drought before being moved to Barzal's line with Anders Lee in mid-March. Upon rejoining his former linemates, the three forwards produced 22 points over 12 games. As a result of their ongoing success, the Islanders clinched a berth in the 2019 Stanley Cup playoffs for their first postseason appearance since 2016. When speaking about the success of the top line, Eberle said: "Since they put me, [Barzal], and [Lee] together the puck has been going in a lot more. I don’t know what we finished the season with, but it seemed like we scored every game." Eberle concluded the season scoring five goals through the final seven games while the top line trio outscored opponents by a 6-2 margin in more than 122 minutes of 5-on-5 hockey. Despite finishing the season strong, Eberle still recorded only 19 goals and 18 assists for 37 points, his fewest since the 2012–13 season. In contrast to his playoff performance in Edmonton, Eberle was a major contributor to the Islanders' sweep of the Pittsburgh Penguins in the First Round of the 2019 Stanley Cup playoffs. He finished the playoffs with nine points in eight postseason games. Once the Islanders were eliminated, Eberle opted to sign a five-year contract extension with the Islanders on June 14, 2019.

During the 2019 offseason, Eberle trained in Calgary with various other hockey players including Mike Green and Maxime Lajoie. Upon returning to the Islanders for the 2019–20 season, Eberle, Barzal, and Lee reunited as the Islanders top line. Eberle recorded three assists through his first five games before suffering an injury on October 12. He eventually returned to the Islanders lineup after missing 10 games for their 2–1 win over the Florida Panthers on 9 November. Eberle later broke his 14-game goalless drought by tallying two goals in their 4–1 win over the Detroit Red Wings on December 2. In his 700th-career NHL game on January 13, Eberle scored his fifth goal of the season and added an assist in the Islanders 6–2 loss to the Rangers. The following day, he recorded his 500th and 501st career NHL points in the Islanders 8–2 win over the Detroit Red Wings. The following month, Eberle recorded his third carer NHL hat-trick to lift the Islanders over the Detroit Red Wings on 21 February. Following his hat-trick, Eberle and Barzal each maintained a point streak of five games. Eberle's point streak included five goals and two assists. In March, the trio combined for 32 points through 10 games before the NHL paused play due to the COVID-19 pandemic. When the NHL paused play, Erbele finished fifth in scoring with 16 goals and 24 assists for 40 points through 58 games.

After four months, the Islanders returned to play for the 2020 Stanley Cup playoffs against the Florida Panthers. Eberle, Barzal, and Lee combined to score three goals in four games to help the team eliminate the Panthers from playoff contention. During Game 1 of their first-round matchup against the Washington Capitals, Eberle scored the Islanders' second goal late in the second period to help lift the team to an eventual 4–2 win. After the Islanders eliminated the Capitals in five games, they met the Philadelphia Flyers in the Eastern Conference Second Round. During the series, the trio of Barzal, Eberle, and Lee were on the ice for 33 high-danger chances for and only 14 against at five-on-five. Eberle ended the series by accumulating six assists while Lee had four goals and Barzal had six points. When the Islanders faced the Tampa Bay Lightning in the Eastern Conference Final, Eberle had accumulated three goals and eight assists for 11 points throughout the postseason. On September 15, 2020, Eberle scored his first playoff overtime winner against in double overtime to stave off elimination and force a Game 6.

Seattle Kraken

After being left unprotected by the Islanders, Eberle was selected by the Seattle Kraken at the 2021 NHL Expansion Draft on July 21, 2021. Leading up to their inaugural 2021–22 season, Mark Giordano was named the inaugural captain of the Kraken on October 11, Eberle, Schwartz, Adam Larsson, and Yanni Gourde were named alternate captains. Eberle was quickly assigned to be a top line winger alongside Jaden Schwartz and Jared McCann. Eberle began the season on a goalless streak before scoring the first hat trick in franchise history on November 4, 2021, to lift the Kraken over the Buffalo Sabres. He subsequently became the ninth NHL player to score a natural hat trick for an expansion team in its inaugural season. Following the hat-trick, Eberle continued to produce as he led the Kraken with six goals through 12 games. Within the next three games, he added two goals to lead the Kraken with eight goals and 12 points in 15 games. During the Kraken's seven-game point streak in November, Eberle scored 10 points before the Kraken then lost six straight games. Eberle later missed two games to recover from an injury but returned for the Kraken's 6–1 loss to the Pittsburgh Penguins on December 6. By the end of his first season in Seattle, he had eclipsed the 20-goal mark for the first time in three seasons, though the Kraken would finish near the bottom of the league standings.

International play

Eberle represented Alberta at the 2007 Canada Games in Whitehorse, Yukon. He notched two goals and an assist in the bronze medal game against British Columbia in Alberta's 4–3 win. He finished the tournament with six goals and five assists in five games played to place eighth in tournament scoring. Several months later, Eberle played for Team Canada's under-18 team at the 2007 Ivan Hlinka Memorial Tournament, but failed to register a point as Canada was kept from a medal. He continued with the national under-18 team the following year at the 2008 IIHF World U18 Championships in Russia. He began the tournament by earning player of the game honours with a two-goal effort in the first round-robin game against Germany—a 9–2 win for Canada. He later notched two goals and an assist in an 8–0 gold medal game win to help Canada to their first tournament championship in five years. Eberle finished the tournament with ten points in seven games, second in team scoring to Cody Hodgson.

In his third WHL season, Eberle was selected to the Team Canada's under-20 team for the 2009 World Junior Championships in Ottawa, Ontario. In the semi-finals, on January 3, 2009, Eberle was named player of the game after scoring two goals and the shootout-winner against Russia in a 6–5 win. Eberle dramatically scored his second goal of the night with just 5.4 seconds left in regulation to force extra time and the eventual shootout, in which he shot first and scored. Defeating Sweden 5–1 in the final, Eberle helped Canada to a record-tying fifth straight gold medal and was named by the coaching staff as one of the team's best three players. At the conclusion of the tournament, Eberle was third in tournament scoring with 13 points (six goals, seven assists).

The following year, Eberle was named to his second national junior team for the 2010 World Junior Championships in his hometown Regina, Saskatchewan. He was selected as an alternate captain to Patrice Cormier along with fellow returnees Colten Teubert, Alex Pietrangelo and Stefan Della Rovere. He was named player of the game against Switzerland in the second game of the round-robin—a 6–0 win—with a five-point game (one goal, four assists). Two games later, he scored two goals in regulation (one of which began a two-goal comeback late in the third period) and one in the shootout against the United States in the final game of the round-robin to earn his second player of the game honour of the tournament. Canada later met the United States again in the gold medal game. Down 5–3 with three minutes to go in regulation, Eberle scored twice to force overtime. His tying goal with 1:35 left made him Canada's all-time leading goal scorer in the tournament with 14 goals, passing John Tavares' mark set the previous year. Canada eventually lost in overtime, earning silver and ending their five-year gold medal streak.

At the conclusion of the tournament, Eberle finished tied for the tournament lead in goals with André Petersson of Sweden and was second in points to Derek Stepan of the United States. He was voted as the Most Valuable Player and Top Forward. He was also named to the tournament All-Star Team by the media and named one of Canada's top three players by the coaches. Three days after the gold medal game, Regina Mayor Pat Fiacco proclaimed January 8, 2010, as "Jordan Eberle and Colten Teubert Day" in the city for their efforts in the tournament.

On April 16, 2010, Eberle was named to Team Canada as an alternate for the 2010 IIHF World Championship held in Germany. After injuries to Ryan Smyth and Steven Stamkos in the preliminary round, he debuted with Canada's men's team on May 14, 2010, against Norway. Eberle scored a goal and assisted on three others to earn the Player of the Game Award in a 12–1 Canadian victory. He played in three more games without any points as Canada finished in seventh place with a loss to Russia in the quarter-final.

Following his NHL rookie season, Eberle joined the Canadian men's team for the second consecutive year for the 2011 IIHF World Championship in Slovakia. During the preliminary round, Eberle scored a goal in a contest against Switzerland to be named player of the game. In a game against the United States during the qualifying round, Eberle scored in a shootout, helping Canada to a 4–3 win, while also temporarily tying them for the lead in their pool. Canada went on to top their pool, but lost 2–1 in the quarter-final against Russia for the second consecutive year. Scoring four times over seven tournament games (no assists), Eberle tied for second in team goal-scoring, behind John Tavares.

At the 2015 World Championships, where Canada won the gold medal for the first time since 2007 with a perfect 10-0 record, Eberle finished second in scoring with     
5 goals and 8 assists, one point behind tournament leader Jason Spezza.

Personal life
Eberle was born to Darren and Lisa Eberle in Regina, Saskatchewan. His dad coached him on his minor hockey teams growing up. He has two sisters, Ashley and Whitney, and a younger brother, Dustin. He attended high school at the Athol Murray College of Notre Dame in Wilcox, Saskatchewan, before moving to Calgary, Alberta, at age 15 with his parents and three siblings. He returned to Regina to play junior hockey for the Regina Pats and attended Archbishop M.C. O'Neill High School during the hockey season. He went on to graduate from Bishop O'Byrne Senior High School in Calgary in June 2008.

Eberle has a cousin, Derek Eberle, who also played junior for the Pats from 1990 to 1993. His brother Dustin was drafted by the Pats in the 12th round, 248th overall, of the 2007 WHL Bantam Draft.

Eberle has been in a relationship with Lauren Rodych since high school. They became engaged in the summer of 2016. The couple got married on July 22, 2017, in Calgary, Alberta.

Career statistics

Regular season and playoffs

International

Awards

Notes

References

External links

1990 births
Living people
Athol Murray College of Notre Dame alumni
Canadian expatriate ice hockey players in the United States
Canadian ice hockey centres
Edmonton Oilers draft picks
Edmonton Oilers players
Ice hockey people from Saskatchewan
National Hockey League first-round draft picks
New York Islanders players
Oklahoma City Barons players
Regina Pats players
Seattle Kraken players
Sportspeople from Regina, Saskatchewan
Springfield Falcons players